Asalouyeh Airport  is located near Asalouyeh, Bushehr Province, Iran. Owned by IRIAF, it was open to civil aviation at the time when economic activity around the PSEEZ necessitated establishment of an air link for the region. The airport was operational until the new Persian Gulf Airport  opened to traffic in July 2006, replacing Asalouyeh Airport.

See also
 List of airports in Iran

References

Airports in Iran
Asaluyeh County
Buildings and structures in Bushehr Province